Coyrecup Lake is an ephemeral salt lake in the Great Southern region of Western Australia located approximately  east of the town of Katanning and about  south east of Perth. The lake is situated within the Coyrecup Nature Reserve, and is part of the Blackwood River drainage basin and the  Hardy Estuary-Coblinine River catchment.

Description
There are Quaternary and Cainozoic alluvial and lacustrine deposits on the valley floors that underlie the lake with variable layers of sand, silt and clay. The landscape is composed mostly of gently undulating rises to low hills with some abrupt breakaways. The remaining native vegetation is dominated by of proteaceous heath scrub, with many endemic species, although the bulk of the surrounding land has been cleared for cereal cropping.

The lake is semi-permanent and will often dry out for several months over summer, usually one year in every three.

It is the headwaters of the Colbinine River and makes up one third of the Dumbleyung Lake basin.

The lake was used for boating in the early twentieth century.

In 1980, 44 small islands were constructed while the lake was dry. The islands were arranged in two clusters, one north of the inflow channel and one to the south. The islands were to act as nesting and refuge areas for waterbirds.

The lake is one of the five sites in the Avon-Wheatbelt area recognised as a DIWA wetland.

Flora

The lake is part of the Dumbleyung Vegetation System, which belongs in the South-west Botanical Province. The lake contains a dense aquatic layer of vegetation over the channel draining into the lake containing Ruppia polycarpa and species of Chara alga.
The littoral vegetation surrounding the lake is composed of low shrubland with many samphire species, dominated by Halosarcia pergranulata, Halosarcia lepidosperma and Sarcocornia quinqueflora. This is surrounded by remnant low open forest and closed scrub. The thickets of closed scrub and low open forest fringing the lake are mostly populated by Casuarina obesa, Melaleuca strobophylla and Disphyma crassifolium, with Melaleuca halmaturorum commonly found in the lake basin. Rare flora species known to be found in the nature reserve are Dryandra porrecta and Blennospora phlegmatocarpa.

Fauna

A total of 70 taxa of aquatic invertebrates have been collected from the lake over the past few years. There are both salt-tolerant freshwater species and halophile species that prefer higher salinity. About half the species collected are macroinvertebrates and half microinvertebrates.

The lake has a significant bird population identified,
and can support a population of tens of thousands. A total of 41 species are known in the lake area and the most abundant wetland species include Australian shelduck, black swan, grey teal, pink-eared duck, pacific black duck and maned duck. Other important species found include the most endangered waterfowl species in Australia, the freckled duck and blue-billed duck. The area is used as breeding habitat by at least five species of waterbirds.

See also

References

Coyrecup
Saline lakes of Western Australia
DIWA-listed wetlands